The Loony Dook  is an annual event held on New Years' Day in which people dive into the freezing waters of the Firth of Forth at South Queensferry (north of Edinburgh, Scotland), often in fancy dress.

The name "Loony Dook" is a combination of "Loony" (short for "lunatic") and "Dook", a Scots term meaning "dip" or "bathe".

Course of events
On New Year's Day, typically in the forenoon (but times vary according to tides), around 1,000 Dookers first take part in the so-called Dookers' Fancy Dress Parade, leading from the Hawes car park at the far end of the town to the old mole. Over 4,000 spectators cheer on the participants at various vantage points.

The Dookers are then greeted by bagpipe pipers and warmed with bowls of "energising porridge", prior to plunging themselves into the freezing Firth of Forth.

History
The event was conceived in 1986 as a joking suggestion by three locals for a New Year's Day hangover cure. The following year, it was decided to repeat the event for charity.

After a few years of only local significance, the event gradually grew in the 1990s, both in popularity and number of participants. The growth accelerated after the event began to be mentioned in the official Edinburgh Hogmanay publicity material and got a boost when the Millennium edition was broadcast live by the BBC.

Originally organised by locals and starting from the Moorings pub (now the Inchcolm), factors such as increased crowds, safety issues and popularity necessitated a different handling. As a consequence, the events from 2009 onwards were professionally handled by event managers Unique Events. Being the organisers of the Edinburgh Hogmanay Festival, they included the Loony Dook into the latter from 2011. In the same year a registration fee was introduced to cover the cost of organisation and stewarding. The fee of originally £6 was raised to £10 in 2016. 
This went up to £12 in 2020, attracting criticism from the event's founders, who described it as a "damned disgrace".

The proceeds benefit RNLI Queensferry and local charities.

The Loony Dook received sponsorship from the tour company Haggis Adventures (from 2011) and then from the porridge company Stoats.

Up to 2016, three of the original Dookers, James MacKenzie, Keith 'Rambo' Armstrong and Kenny Ross, have the distinction of taking part in every Loony Dook and the trio wore specially designed T-shirts with ‘30 yrs’ to celebrate the achievement.

Other Loony Dooks 
The event has inspired similar annual New Year's day Loony Dooks, such as in North Berwick and Dunbar in East Lothian, Portobello in Edinburgh, St Andrews, Dalgety Bay and Kirkcaldy in Fife and Coldingham Sands in Berwickshire all of which are on the south east coast of Scotland.

See also
Edinburgh's Hogmanay 
South Queensferry
Forth Bridge

References

External links
 South Queensferry Stoats Loony Dook 2016 on YouTube
 Stoats 2016 Loony Dook New Years Day South Queensferry Near Edinburgh Scotland on YouTube

1986 establishments in Scotland
Recurring events established in 1986
Festivals in Edinburgh
Annual events in Scotland
Hogmanay
Firth of Forth
Swimming in Scotland